The Ukrainian Premier League (Ukrayinska Premier Liha) or UPL is the highest division of Ukrainian annual football championship. As the Vyshcha Liha (Top League) it was formed in 1991 as part of the 1992 Ukrainian football championship upon discontinuation of the 1991 Soviet football championship and included the Ukraine-based clubs that competed previously in the Soviet top three tiers competitions as well as better clubs of the Ukrainian republican competitions. The initial season of the league featured six former Soviet Top League clubs among which were Dynamo, Shakhtar, Chornomorets, Dnipro, Metalist, Metalurh as well as four more clubs that previously also competed at the top league.

In 1996 along with the other professional football leagues of Ukraine, the Top League became a member of the Professional Football League of Ukraine. In 2008 it was withdrawn from Professional Football League of Ukraine and reformed into a separate self governed entity of the Football Federation of Ukraine, officially changing its name to the current one. Its rank was 12th highest in Europe as rated by UEFA as of 2021.

As a leading club of the Soviet Top League, Dynamo Kyiv continues to be the league's "flagship club", while in the last 10 seasons the league is dominated by Shakhtar Donetsk 8 to 2. Three of Ukrainian clubs reached European club competitions finals including Dynamo (as Soviet club), Shakhtar and Dnipro. Among Ukrainian fans the most popular Ukrainian clubs are Dynamo Kyiv and Shakhtar Donetsk. Other popular clubs include Karpaty Lviv, Metalist Kharkiv, Chornomorets Odesa and Dnipro.

General overview and format
The 2020–21 season is the league's thirteenth after the restructuring of professional club football in 2008 and the 30th season since establishing of professional club's competition independent from the Soviet Union. As of 2021, Dynamo Kyiv is the reigning Ukrainian Premier League champion. To summarise, Tavriya Simferopol won the first championship, while all the subsequent titles have gone to either Dynamo Kyiv or Shakhtar Donetsk. Only 2 teams, Dynamo Kyiv and Shakhtar Donetsk have participated in all previous 29 Ukrainian Top League competitions. The central feature of the league is a game between the same Dynamo and Shakhtar, which developed into the Klasychne (Classic).

On 15 April 2008 the new Premier-Liha (Premier League) was formed. It consists of 12 football clubs that take control of the league's operations under the statues of Football Federation of Ukraine, UEFA, and FIFA. With the new reorganization the format of the League was preserved, while the changes that were made were exclusively administrative. Competitions continued to be conducted in a double round robin format among 16 clubs. There were a couple of seasons when the league experimented with a 14 club composition.

Since the 2014 Russian aggression, the league was reduced to 12 members, while its format has changed. The season is still being played in a double round robin in the first half of a season, after which the league splits in half into two groups of six teams. Both the top six and the bottom six play another a double round robin tournament with the clubs of their grouping. For 2019-20 a post season play-off for qualification for the European club competitions was introduced.

The teams that reach the top ranks of the competition table at the end of each season, gain the chance to represent Ukraine internationally in several prestigious tournaments (continental club tournaments). At the end of the season, the bottom clubs (usually two) are relegated to the First League, part of the lower Professional Football League, and are replaced by the top clubs from that league. All the participants of the Premier League enter the National Cup competition and enter it at the round of 32 (1/16th of the final) or Round of 16 stage.

The winner of the League at the beginning of every next season plays against the winner of the National Cup for the Ukrainian Super Cup, under administration of the Premier Liha. Beside Super Cup game and championship among senior teams of the league's clubs, the league conducts competitions among junior teams, including under 21s and under 19s. The champion of the under 19 championship qualifies for the UEFA Youth League.

Emblem

The old emblem depicts a football wrapped by a blue-yellow stripe, the national colors of Ukraine, on a blue background. Across the top and around the ball there are 16 stars that represent the league's participants. In 2014 when the league was reduced to 14 teams, the emblem wasn't changed. On the bottom, the script says "Premier-League – Union of Professional Football Clubs of Ukraine".

As with the old emblem, the new emblem contains 16 stars. For the 2016–17 season, the sponsor's name was added.

Title sponsors

Since at least 2006, the league has placed its sponsors' names in its seasons' titles. The first sponsor was Russian-Ukrainian alcoholic beverage company "Soyuz-Viktan", in the 2006–07 Ukrainian championship. While the contract was signed for five years and officially presented by the presidents of the Football Federation of Ukraine and the Professional Football League of Ukraine as a title sponsor, Soyuz-Viktan was expected to stay for couple of seasons. But in 2007 a new title sponsor, "Biola" from Dnipro was announced.

Previously "Soyuz-Viktan" was sponsoring the Russian ice hockey team and its Hockey Super League. In 2006 it also became the sponsor of the newly established Channel One Cup. Back in 2002, Mirror Weekly published an article that leaders of "Soyuz-Viktan" were convicted in the Autonomous Republic of Crimea to 15 years imprisonment. The reputation of "Soyuz-Viktan" was questioned on several occasions.

Soon after establishment of the Premier-Liha, in 2008 a contract was signed with a new sponsor, Epitsentr K, a network of home improvement stores. The sum of the contract was announced as $3.6 million, while just three months before there were speculations that new sponsor would pay no less than $5 million. In 2013 the contract expired.

A new contract was established in 2015 with a bookmaking company Pari-Match, which lasted for couple of seasons.

 2006–07: Soyuz-Viktan.
 2007–08: Biola.
 2008–09 – 2011–12: Epitsentr.
 2015–16 – 2016–17: Pari-Match.
 2019–20 – 2020–21 FavBet.
 2021–22 – VBet.

Season's format and regulations
Season regulations are one of the two most important documents (other being the competition calendar) that are adopted by the Premier League prior to each season.

The Premier League directly organizes and conducts competitions among member clubs. Competitions are conducted on the principle of "Fair play" and according to the competition calendar which is approved by the Premier League General Assembly and the FFU Executive Committee 30 days before start of competitions. Until 2019 all advertisement, commercial rights and rights on TV and radio broadcasting of games of championship and cup belong to the club that hosts them (the Super Cup of Ukraine and the "Gold game"). All advertisement, commercial rights and rights on TV and radio broadcasting of the game of Super Cup and the "Gold game". Before 2014 Premier League was also administering some rounds of the Ukrainian Cup (round of 8, quarterfinals, and semifinals). The earlier rounds were administered by the Professional League and the final by the Federation. Since 2014 the organization of Ukrainian Cup competitions in full belongs exclusively to the Federation.

There are currently 12 club members of the league. All participants get approved by the Premier League General Assembly. Each club fields each team for senior competitions, and competitions for under 21 and under 19 teams (three teams). A club is required to have a stadium (registered with FFU) and an education and training facility (or center). A club is also obligated to finance its own youth sports institution and a complex scientific-methodical group as well as to own and finance a number of youth teams. A Premier League club needs to ensure participation of at least four youth teams (ages groups between 14 and 17) in the Youth Football League of Ukraine. A club cannot field more than one team for a certain competition.

All club's staff members (coaches, physicians, massage specialists) have to be contracted and be UEFA licensed. All coaches should have A-diploma, while head coaches – PRO-diploma. Football players are listed in "A" and "B" rosters. "A" roster contains no more than 25 players, while "B" roster has unlimited number of players no older than 21 who have professional contracts or agreements for sports training. The 25-players "A" roster includes the number of slots allotted for players developed by the club.

During breaks in competitions in summer and winter there are two periods for registering players.

Beside the main championship among senior teams, the Premier League also organizes youth championship which was adopted from the previous Vyshcha Liha championship of doubles (reserves). Since 2012 there was added another competition for junior teams, so the original youth championship was renamed into the Championship of U-21 teams and the new competition was named as the Championship of U-19 teams. Unlike the Championship of U-21 teams, in the Championship of U-19 teams beside all of the Premier League clubs' junior teams, there also compete teams of some lower leagues' clubs.

The league's championship among senior teams is conducted by manner of the round robin system in two cycles "fall-spring" with one game at home and another at opponent's field with each participant. A competition calendar is formed after a draw that is conducted based on the Premier League club rankings. The calendar of the second cycle repeats the first, while hosting teams are switched. There should be no less than two calendar days between official games of a club. All games take place between 12:00 and 22:00 local time. Any game postponement is allowed only in emergencies and on decision of the Premier League Administration (Dyrektsiya). Game forfeitures are controlled by technical win/loss nominations and fines, followed by additional sanctions of the FFU Control-Disciplinary Committee, and possible elimination from the league.

Competition calendar
Clubs play each other twice (once at home and once away) in the 26-match season. The league begins in mid-July and ends in mid-June. After 13 rounds of fixtures, there is a winter break that lasts for three months (from early December to early March). Thus, the winter break is significantly longer than the interval between seasons. This schedule accounts for climatic conditions and matches that of most European leagues in terms of the beginning and the end of the season.

The first season of the League in 1992 was an exception, as it lasted only half a year. This was because the last Soviet league season ended in the autumn of 1991, and the Football Federation of Ukraine decided to shift the calendar from "spring-fall" to "fall-spring" football seasons. In the inaugural season, 20 clubs were divided into two 10-team groups. In both groups, each club played each other twice, and the championship was decided by a play-off match between the group winners, in which Tavriya Simferopol surprised the pre-season favorite Dynamo Kyiv.

After the first season, in each of the following seasons each team played each other team in the League twice. The number of participating teams fluctuated between 14 and 18, stabilizing since 2002–03 season at 16.

As of the 2005–06 season, the golden match rule was introduced. According to the rule, if the first two teams obtain the same number of points, the championship is to be decided by an additional "golden" match between the two teams. In fact, in that season Dynamo Kyiv and Shakhtar Donetsk had earned the same number of points and Shakhtar won the championship by winning the golden match (2–1 after extra time).

History

Creation
Before 1992, Ukrainian domestic football league competitions were conducted among Ukrainian teams that competed in one of groups within the Soviet third tier consisting of around 20 teams. Beside that championship another over 20 teams competed in two upper tiers where they played along with other teams across the Soviet Union. Also, at the same time there were conducted competitions among KFK (amateur teams) at lower level. With the Soviet Union tumbling down (as one classic once called it, "the biggest geopolitical disaster of the 20th century"), in late 1991 there arose discussion about creation of separate competition which would include all better Ukrainian clubs. Following the failed 1991 August putsch, the Ukrainian parliament declared a state independence and appointed a date of referendum to confirm the decision.

Despite the failed putsch and declaration of independence by number of Soviet union republics, the Football Federation of the Soviet Union continued with planning of the 1992 football season. In September 1991 in Soviet magazine "Futbol" appeared some comments from head coaches of Ukrainian clubs playing in the Soviet First League (Tavriya and Bukovyna). The Tavriya head coach Anatoliy Zayaev said that the club is strongly against participation in Ukrainian championship and intend to continue to play in Soviet championship. The Bukovyna head coach Yukhym Shkolnykov said that the club does not have any wishes to return to the Ukrainian group as planned by the republican federation and no one should let politics transverse football.

In October 1991 some Moscow press took a big interview from FC Dnipro head coach Yevhen Kucherevsky titled "How to live on?" His direct speech had started with a phrase "Dnipro is definitely for the Soviet championship". Next Yevhen Mefodiyich told about possible isolation of Ukrainian football, because if Ukraine would not be recognized by the World, there is nothing to think about membership in FIFA or UEFA. After that recalling some kind of World Basket League, Kucherevsky discussed the topic that "people are uniting , but we..." When questioned "what is the mood among coaches of other Ukrainian teams", he firmly answered "Almost all are for the united championship and against separate Ukrainian".

In particular, Kucherevsky mentioned his talks with head coach of Shakhtar Valeriy Yaremchenko. According to Kucherevsky, the majority of Dnipro's fans, judging by their letters and telephone calls also consider that conducting of Ukrainian championship not in time. Ended his interview Kucherevsky with a phrase that "he wants to hope that the situation when they have to play in a separate championship will never come". The coach even allowed the thought that Ukraine could be recognized as an independent state, but proposes an idea of the "Soviet open championship", referring to... the case with NHL.

In general Kucherevsky was speaking of true situation. Among all Ukrainian teams of the Soviet Top League, only Dynamo was clearly and firmly for its own independent championship. Other clubs took position from "strongly against" to "possibly for, but". For example, Metalurh Zaporizhya that was playing its first season at such level was for the Soviet championship. Yet, Metalist that was struggling to stay in, took a tricky position: "If we are would relegate to the First Union League, we will be for Ukrainian championship, if we would stay at the top, we will be for Soviet championship".

In September 1991 there took place a session of the Football Federation of the Ukrainian SSR Executive Committee (ispolkom), which started with raising of blue-and-yellow flag that was given by a member of parliament Vyacheslav Chornovil. On proposition of Viktor Bannikov who at time was heading the football federation, the struggle for independent championship had to take place under national colors. The executive committee decided that blue-and-yellow flags had to flown over all stadiums where were playing Ukrainian teams. Some members of the executive committee have spoken about the independent Ukrainian championship, but did not rush with a decision. For that it was decided to wait until the Federation's plenum on 13–14 December 1991.

Vyshcha Liha and Professional Football League (1992–1999)
Since the fall of the Soviet Union, the inaugural independent championship took place hastily at the start of spring 1992 after the creation of the Ukrainian Higher League (Vyshcha Liha). The League was created out of the six teams that took part in the Soviet Top League, two teams from the Soviet First League, and nine out of the eleven Ukrainian teams from the Soviet Second League. The other two of that eleven were placed in the Ukrainian First League as they were to be relegated anyway. The two best teams of the Soviet Second League B of the Ukrainian Zone were also placed in the Higher League along with the winner of the 1991 Ukrainian Cup which finished ninth in the same group (Soviet Second League B).

The 20 participants were split into two groups with the winners playing for the championship title and the runners-up playing for third place. Three teams from each group were to be relegated. As expected, the five favorites, Dynamo Kyiv, Dnipro Dnipropetrovsk, Shakhtar Donetsk, Chornomorets Odesa, and Metalist Kharkiv finished at the top of each group. In the championship play-off game in Lviv, a sensation took place as Tavriya Simferopol beat Dynamo Kyiv 1–0. The Crimeans earned the first Ukrainian title (thus far their only one), losing only once to Temp Shepetivka.

After being stunned in the first championship by the tragedy in Lviv, Dynamo Kyiv were anxious to earn their first title at the second opportunity. In the second Ukrainian championship, which had a regular League format of 16 teams, the main rivals of the Kyivians were Dnipro Dnipropetrovsk, who were top after the first half of the season. By the end of the season both teams were neck and neck and at the end they finished with the same number of points. The championship title was awarded to Dynamo Kyiv as they had a better goal difference. Neither the Golden match, nor the fact that Dnipro Dnipropetrovsk had a better head-to-head record was considered.

The next seven years were known as the total domination of Dynamo Kyiv. During this period 'the main Soviet protagonists' had changed as some of the best teams were facing a crisis. After the 1993–94 season Metalist Kharkiv were surprisingly relegated to the First League. In the 1995–96 season Shakhtar Donetsk had the worst year in the club's history, coming tenth. Chornomorets Odesa were relegated twice during that first decade after which manager Leonid Buryak was sacked. A few newly created teams have since emerged such as Arsenal Kyiv and Metalurh Donetsk, as well as Vorskla Poltava, who surprisingly came third in the club's first season at the Top Level in the 1997.

Dynamo–Shakhtar rivalry and Premier League (2000–2010)

The next decade was marked by fierce competition between Dynamo Kyiv and Shakhtar Donetsk. Since 2000, Shakhtar Donetsk has proved to be the real challengers to Kyiv's dominance. In 2000 Shakhtar earned their first qualification to the Champions League earning a place in the Group stage. Nonetheless, Dynamo Kyiv is still considered to be the benchmark of excellence in the country and the primary feeder to the Ukraine national football team. 2002 became the real cornerstone in the miners history when they earned their first national title under the management of the newly appointed Italian specialist, Nevio Scala, who managed to secure the Ukrainian Cup title as well. Since that time the issue of foreign players has become particularly acute and brought a series of court cases. The FFU and PFL worked together to solve that issue, coming up with a plan to force the transitional limitation of foreign players over time.

The clubs such as Dnipro Dnipropetrovsk and Chornomorets Odesa, who were recent contenders for the title, had to put up a fierce fight against the newly established contenders Metalurh Donetsk and Metalist Kharkiv to qualify for the European competitions. Metalist Kharkiv shone brightly in the late 2000s (decade) by consistently finishing right behind Dynamo Kyiv and Shakhtar Donetsk in third place. Their most remarkable feat was their participation in the 2009 European season when they had to face Dynamo Kyiv to earn a place in the quarter-finals of the 2008–09 UEFA Cup, but lost on the away goals rule. That same 2008–09 UEFA Cup competition was won for the first time by Shakhtar Donetsk, the first club of independent Ukraine to win the title. It was also the last UEFA cup title before it changed its name to the Europa league. In the 2008–09 season the league earned the highest UEFA league coefficient in Europe for that season.

On 15 November 2007 clubs' presidents of the Vyshcha Liha adopted a decision to create the Premier League (Premier Liha). At the same meeting session there was created a supervisory board that consisted of Ravil Safiullin (Professional Football League), Vitaliy Danilov (FC Kharkiv), Petro Dyminskyi (FC Karpaty), and Vadym Rabinovych (FC Arsenal). During the next three months that body curated a process on creation of the Premier League's regulation and statute as well as a procedure of launching the championship starting from the 2008–09 season. On 15 April 2008 at one of the meetings among the presidents of clubs there was signed a protocol about establishing the Association of Professional Football Clubs of Ukraine "Premier-Liha" as an autonomous entity, parting away from the PFL.

The Premier League has been split since the moment it was created in regards to its president. The dispute went as far as even canceling the 13th round of 2009–10 season and moving it to the spring half, while having the 14th round still playing in the fall. The representatives of five clubs: Arsenal Kyiv, Dynamo Kyiv, Dnipro Dnipropetrovsk, Kryvbas Kryvyi Rih, and Metalist Kharkiv have been boycotting most of the League meetings, not complying with its financial obligations and giving the broadcasting rights to TV-channels other than the League official supplier. They justified their actions due to what they deem to be the illegal election of the Premier League president. The representatives of the above-mentioned clubs did not recognize the election in 2008 of Vitaliy Danilov as the president and believed that the elections should have been won by Vadim Rabinovich.

To resolve this conflict Vitaliy Danilov instigated the re-election of the Premier League president in September 2009, and on 1 December 2009 won the election again with 11 clubs voting for his candidature, 3 were against, 1 abstained, and 1 was absent. This time most club presidents of the Premier League of Ukraine acknowledged Vitaliy Danilov legality. In the subsequent elections on 9 December 2011 Vitaliy Danilov was challenged by Andriy Kurhanskyi (through the proposal of Karpaty Lviv). The other available candidates, Miletiy Balchos (president of the Professional Football League of Ukraine) and Yuriy Kindzerskyi, were not picked by any members of the Premier League. Vitaliy Danilov managed to retain his seat with nine votes for him.

Big Four and two-round league (2011–present) 

Starting from 2010 and to 2014 season, FC Shakhtar led by Romanian coach Mircea Lucescu obtained five national league titles in a row, making Lucescu the most successful manager in the history of the league with 9 titles. At the same time, in the beginning of 2010s the so-called "Big Four" of clubs eventually formed, consisting from Shakhtar, Dynamo, Metalist and Dnipro. These four clubs consecutively took all the top 4 places for five seasons from 2009–10 to 2013–14 and displayed the biggest financial abilities in the league.

In 2012–13, Metalist Kharkiv finished second and qualified for the UEFA Champions League for the first time, the achievement which was repeated by Dnipro in the next season. In the same 2013–14 season Dynamo Kyiv for the first time since Ukrainian independence placed as low as fourth in league's season ranking, which led to dismissal of former national team coach and the legend of Soviet football Oleh Blokhin as the club's manager. In European football, new club achievements were set in these years for Shakhtar in 2010–11 UEFA Champions League quarter-finals and for Metalist in 2011–12 UEFA Europa League quarter-finals.

Because of the Russian aggression against Ukraine and subsequent cleaning of the league from the clubs that became financially unreliable (Metalist, Hoverla, Metalurh Donetsk, Dnipro), the number of teams participating in the league was cut from 16 in the 2013–14 season to 14 in the following two seasons. Both of the seasons were won by Dynamo Kyiv with Serhii Rebrov as manager. With the continuation of the military conflict in the eastern oblasts  of Ukraine since 2014 and its economic impact, the league was forced to change its format again and started to be contested by 12 teams after being cut from 14 after the 2015–16 season, introducing the two stages of the competition: after the standard two rounds of games the league would split into two 6-team groups according to their positions.

Under the new format, Shakhtar Donetsk under the manager Paulo Fonseca managed to win three league titles in a row from 2016–17 to 2018–19, runner-up in all the three seasons being Dynamo Kyiv. In 2019–20 season, Shakhtar set the record of the earliest title win in the history, win 5 rounds remaining. In 2019, the decision was adopted to expand the league to 14 teams from the 2020–21 and to 16 teams from the 2021–22 season. In April 2022, it was announced that the current UPL season has been terminated due to the extension of martial law in Ukraine. The football clubs of the UPL also expressed their support for the termination, since it is not possible to end the championship due to the country’s current state. Thus, it was concluded that the standings as of February 24, 2022 will be the final standings of the 2021/22 season, and there will be no winners to be awarded.

Officials

Presidents
Vitaliy Danilov, 27 May 2008 – 29 February 2016 (until 1 July 2009 – temporary acting, as president of FC Kharkiv, reelected on 1 July 2009 and 9 December 2011)
Volodymyr Heninson, 29 February 2016 – 6 April 2018
Thomas Grimm, 6 April 2018 – 5 April 2020
 (executive director, acting) Yevhen Dykyi
TBA, (elections postponed; previously to dates 27 April 2020, 25 May 2020)

Directors
General director: Oleksandr Yefremov
Executive director: Yevhen Dykyi
Sport director: Petro Ivanov
Development director: Vadym Halahan

Competitions
 National championship (Favbet Liha)
 Championship among under-21
 Championship among under-19
 Super Cup

Clubs
A total of 43 clubs have played in the Premier League up to 2019–20 season, 20 of which were the founding members of the inaugural 1992 season and 23 other were promoted in the later seasons.

Current clubs 
The following teams are competing in the 2021–22 season. Note, in parenthesis shown the actual home cities and stadiums.

a: Team played in every Ukrainian top flight season

Maps

Broadcasting
The UPL broadcaster in the 2022/23, 2023/24 and 2024/25 seasons is Setanta Sports. All matches are broadcast on the OTT platform. Also, at least 4 matches of the tour are broadcast on the company's linear TV channels, and 1-2 matches of the tour are broadcast free of charge on the Setanta YouTube channel.

International broadcasters 
The main international broadcaster of the league in west Europe and some countries of Africa is the French Ma Chaîne Sport providing coverage for such countries like France, and satellite communities in Andorra, Switzerland, Belgium, Luxembourg, Monaco, Algeria, Morocco, Tunisia. Another broadcaster Sport Klub provides coverage in all countries of former Yugoslavia including Bosnia/Herzegovina, Croatia, Macedonia, Serbia, and Slovenia. National broadcasters of some other counties include 12 TV (Armenia), CBC Sport (Azerbaijan), Polsat Futbol (Poland), Futbol (Russia), and Dolce Sport (Romania).

UEFA ranking and European competitions

Ukrainian clubs being part of the Soviet Union competed in European competitions since 1960s when the Soviet clubs started to participate in continental competitions. In fact the very first Soviet club that took part in European competitions was Ukrainian club, FC Dynamo Kyiv, that took in the 1965–66 European Cup Winners' Cup. Before the fall of the Soviet Union, the following Ukrainian clubs participated in European competitions: FC Dynamo Kyiv (1965), FC Karpaty Lviv (1970), FC Zorya Luhansk (1973), FC Chornomorets Odessa (1975), FC Shakhtar Donetsk (1977), FC Dnipro (1984), and FC Metalist Kharkiv (1988).

At least five clubs participated in top continental competitions the European Cup and the UEFA Champions League among which are FC Dynamo Kyiv, FC Dnipro, FC Metalist Kharkiv, FC Shakhtar Donetsk, and SC Tavriya Simferopol.

Two teams (Dynamo and Shakhtar) were able to obtain trophies of European competitions including two European Cup Winners' Cups, one European Super Cup, and one UEFA Cup. One more team (Dnipro) came just short to join their company losing in the 2015 UEFA Europa League Final.

International relations
In 2009 The Ukrainian Premier League joined the European Professional Football Leagues. Also in 2009 the league signed a partnership with IMG of which during the first month of cooperation sold broadcasting rights for the Ukrainian Cup to Poland and Armenia. On its own initiative the Ukrainian Premier League sold broadcasting rights to Romania and Russia as well.

Results by season

Higher League (Vyshcha Liha)
Professional Football League of Ukraine was the governing body of the Top League (Vyshcha Liha) from 1996 to 2008.

Premier League

Notes: 
 Rank column shows the ranking of the league amongst members of UEFA.
 In bold are the league winners that also won the Ukrainian Cup (season double).
 ‡ – indicates a team that also won the Ukrainian Cup in the same season.
 Metalist Kharkiv had been stripped of their bronze award for 2007–08 season after the Court of Arbitration for Sport in Lausanne ruled against the game Karpaty – Metalist (19 April 2008). 
 A citizen of Serbia, Marko Devich was granted the Ukrainian citizenship after the 2007–08 season.
 A citizen of Brazil, Júnior Moraes was granted the Ukrainian citizenship in March 2019.

Performance by club

Note: Defunct teams marked in Italics.

Honored teams
A representative star is placed above the team's badge to indicate 10 league titles. Dynamo Kyiv became the first Ukrainian team to achieve the prestigious honor of winning the Soviet Top League for the 10th time in 1981. Dynamo Kyiv after having entered the Ukrainian championship has become the same dominant leader as during the Soviet times by earning its 20th national title at the top level in 1999. The two stars were added to the club's logo in 2007. Earning its 10th national title in 2017, Shakhtar Donetsk has not yet adopted a star on its crest.

Currently (as of 2020) the following clubs earned the star element to be added to their crest.
  Dynamo Kyiv (13 in Soviet Union; 16 in Ukraine).
 Shakhtar Donetsk (13 in Ukraine)
 Dnipro (2 in Soviet Union)
 Zorya Luhansk (1 in Soviet Union)
 Tavriya Simferopol (1 in Ukraine)

Prestige trophy
From 2016–17 to 2019–20 seasons, the league conducted season competition in two rounds, where after the first double round robin tournament the league is split in half into two groups of six teams. Then, top six play second double round robin for the title, while the bottom six play to determine teams to be relegated (and Europa League playoff participants in the 2019–20 season). The team that won the relegation group receives a consolation-type honorary award, the Prestige trophy.

Premier League players

Ex-Dynamo Kyiv strikers Maksim Shatskikh and Serhii Rebrov hold the record for most Ukrainian Premier League goals with 123, with Shatskikh winning the top single season scorer title twice in 1999–2000 and 2002–03, Rebrov once in 1997–98.
Since the first Ukrainian Premier League season in 1992, 22 different players have won or shared the top scorer's title. 
Only five players have won the title more than once, Tymerlan Huseynov, Maksim Shatskikh, Yevhen Seleznyov, Alex Teixeira and Júnior Moraes.

Henrikh Mkhitaryan holds the record for most goals in a season (25), Serhii Rebrov and Maksim Shatskikh are the only two players to score at least 20 goals twice. The most prolific all-time scorers are Ivan Hetsko and Viktor Leonenko, respectively attaining 0.59 and 0.57 goals per game.

Premier League managers

The league's record holder for winnings is Mircea Lucescu.

 Note: following dissolution of the Soviet Union, the league was joined by three managers from Ukraine that previously won Soviet titles among which are Valeriy Lobanovskyi (1974, 1975, 1977, 1980, 1981, 1985, 1986), Yevhen Kucherevskyi (1988), and Anatoliy Puzach (1990).

The league's record holder for games in the league is Myron Markevych. 

Among other coaches who stayed in the league the longest, there are Anatoliy Chantsev (150), Roman Sanzhar (145), Ihor Yavorskyi (144), Viktor Prokopenko (140), Nikolay Kostov (139), Vasyl Sachko (137), Oleksandr Zavarov (134), Roman Pokora (129), Oleksandr Sevidov (129), and Ivan Balan (123).

All-time participants
The table lists the place each team took in each of the seasons.

Vyshcha Liha era (1992–2008)

Premier League era (2008–present) 

Teams marking (as of 2020–21):

All-time table
All figures are correct through the 2021–22 season. Promotion/relegation playoff games are not included. Teams in bold currently compete in Premier League. Numbers in bold indicate the record values for each column.

List of bankrupt clubs
 FC Dnipro (formerly Dnipro Dnipropetrovsk); soon after playing at the 2015 UEFA Europa League Final, the club was forced into relegation due to ignoring the FIFA sanctions and eventually its first team was dissolved
 FC Metalist Kharkiv; denied license due to heavy debts
 FC Hoverla Uzhhorod; denied license due to heavy debts
 FC Kryvbas Kryvyi Rih; denied license for failure to provide evidence of stable financial support
 FC Kharkiv; denied license for giving false documentation about financial condition in the club
 FC Arsenal Kyiv; club was not able to finish the 2013–14 season
 FC Arsenal-Kyiv Kyiv; is considered a direct successor of Arsenal Kyiv (2001–2013) soon after relegation in 2019 it announced about liquidation of its first team
 FC Karpaty Lviv; was not able to finish the 2019–20 and announced that it is a bankrupt, but allowed to keep professional status and restart at the third tier. In 2020 it was split and original club following 2020–21 was dissolved, while the newly formed was admitted to the third tier from amateurs.
 SC Tavriya Simferopol, playing since 1958, the club became liquidated in 2014 by the Russian authorities following occupation of the Autonomous Republic of Crimea. In 2016 it was revived based out of neighboring Kherson Oblast and playing in lower tiers until the full-scale Russian invasion in 2022.
 FC Metalurh Zaporizhia; during the 2015–16 season on 2 March 2016, Metalurh was recognized as bankrupt on decision of the commercial court of Zaporizhzhia Oblast and a liquidation procedure was initiated.
 FC Metalurh Donetsk; was merged with FC Stal Dniprodzerzhynsk in 2015, due to hardship caused by the 2014 Russian aggression against Ukraine
 FC Mariupol, in connection with the full-scale invasion of Ukraine by Russia and occupation of the city of Mariupol as well as financial inability of to keep the club, on 27 April 2022 it was announced that the club withdraws from national competitions and dissolves.

List of successions
 FC Karpaty Lviv, it joined Ukraine national competitions already as a phoenix club of the same club that was merged with SKA Lvov and later revived in 1989. In 2020 Karpaty were expelled from the Premier League due to financial hardship. The same year the club was recreated for the second time being split between two entities one joining the third tier competition, while another the fourth. In 2021 the split was resolved by one of the clubs becoming disbanded.
 FC Vorskla Poltava, it joined Ukraine national competitions already as a phoenix club of Kolos Poltava that was disbanded and revived in 1984 based on its football academy.
 FC Metalist Kharkiv, created in 2019 as Metal Kharkiv, in 2021 it was officially recognized as a successor of the Metalist that bankrupted back in 2016.
 FC Kryvbas Kryvyi Rih, renewed its participation in national competitions in 2018, in 2020 FC Hirnyk Kryvyi Rih changed its name to Kryvbas allowing to continue on the legacy with all its colors and logos of bankrupted FC Kryvbas Kryvyi Rih, while at the same time keeping its academy's name as Hirnyk.
 FC Arsenal Kyiv, it is considered a successor of the club that appeared in national competitions in 1993 as FC Boryspil that was admitted to the third tier in place of FC Nyva Myronivka (Nyva-Borysfen). In 1995 it was already promoted to the top tier as a joint venture along the Ministry of Defense and named as CSKA-Borysfen Kyiv, while the original CSKA team was kept playing in lower tiers. In 1996 the merger was dissolved and until 2001 in the top tier competed CSKA Kyiv while in the second tier competed its reserves CSKA-2 Kyiv. In mid season 2001–02 the club was sold to the city of Kyiv and renamed to Arsenal Kyiv in honour of another club that existed back in 1960s. Around 2008-2010 it ran a campaign to claim heritage of the Arsenal Kyiv factory club, SC Arsenal. Unable to finish the 2013–14, in 2013 it folded. Yet, already in 2014 it was revived as Arsenal-Kyiv Kyiv and soon it made through several tiers back to the top tier where after a single season folded again in 2019.

Heritage claims
 FC Chornomorets Odesa, created in 1958, it lays claims also to heritage of Pischevik Odessa, Metalurh Odesa and Dynamo Odesa.
 FC Metalist 1925 Kharkiv, created in 2016, it lays claims also to heritage of the Metalist that bankrupted in 2016.
 MFC Metalurh Zaporizhia, following bankruptcy of the original club and its exclusion from competitions, in 2016 there was created new Metalurh Zaporizhia based on a privately owned local amateur team Rosso-Nero and for few seasons competed in lower leagues and at the same time another Metalurh Zaporizhia was created in 2017 based on the older Metalurh academy (sports school) being financed by the city authorities. In 2018 the UAF denied license for the Rosso-Nero's Metalurh when the Zaporizhia city's Metalurh was admitted to the Professional League (third tier).

Post-season play-offs
There were several instances when the games outside of regular double round-robin tournament and split group seasons were scheduled or required. They were held either for determining the league position (golden and third place matches), international competitions qualification (Europa League play-off) or promotion or relegation (relegation play-off).

Golden matches
League finals for Premier League took place on two occasions. In the inaugural 1992 season, the league was conducted in two groups of 10 teams due to transition to the autumn-spring competition calendar. The teams in each group played a double round-robin tournament, after which the winners of both groups faced each other in the one-match league final at neutral field. The final was played on 21 June 1992, crowning Tavriya Simferopol as the first champions of independent Ukraine after their 1–0 win over Dynamo Kyiv.

Starting from the 2005–06 season, if multiple teams finish tied on points on the top of the table, Golden match is required to determine the champion. In the same season, this rule came into effect for the first and only to the moment time: Shakhtar Donetsk and Dynamo Kyiv both finished with 75 points after the regular season. In the following final game, Shakhtar managed to win the title after the 100th-minute goal from Julius Aghahowa which concluded their 2–1 extra-time win.

Third place matches
Similarly to the league final, in the inaugural 1992 season the third place match was played between the runners-up of both 10-team groups that formed the league in the season. In the game at neutral field, Dnipro Dnipropetrovsk from Group B defeated Shakhtar Donetsk from Group A 3–2 and won their first bronze medals in the league.

Europa League play-offs
In the 2019–20 season, play-offs for qualification to the UEFA Europa League are played for the first time between the 5th and 6th teams from the Championship round and two top teams from the Relegation round (7th and 8th). The play-off consists of the semi-final and final stages, with ties in both played as single matches on the field of the team ranked higher in the season standings.

Relegation play-offs
For the first tome, play-off to determine the participant of the next Vyshcha Liha season was held unplanned at the end of the 1998–99 season. Third-placed team of 1998–99 First League, Torpedo Zaporizhzhia, who was to be promoted, filed for bankruptcy at the end of the season. The league regulations at the time did not specify what actions are needed to be taken in such situation, so PFL made a decision to held a play-off game between the highest-ranked relegated team, Prykarpattia Ivano-Frankivsk, and highest-ranked not promoted team, FC Cherkasy at neutral field in Kyiv. The game ended with Prykarpattia defending their league place 3–1.

In the 2001–02 season, due to league enlargement play-off was held between the second-lowest Vyshcha Liha team, Polihraftekhnika Oleksandriya, and fourth First League team, Polissya Zhytomyr. The game on a neutral field in Kyiv ended 1–0 in favour of Oleksandriya.

Since 2017–18 season, the play-offs are held in home-and-away format between the 10th and 11th teams from Premier League, and 2nd and 3rd from First League. During this time, 3 teams were promoted by play-offs, and another 1 managed to defend its place. However, in the 2019–20 season there will be no playoffs because of the league enlargement and three teams will promote from First League directly.

Rivalries and city derbies

Klasychne derby

The central feature of the league is a rivalry between Shakhtar Donetsk and Dynamo Kyiv which has adopted its name as Klasychne derby. The rivalry started ever since the end of 1990s when both teams started consistently to place the top two places from season to season. The rivalry became really established when Shakhtar obtained its first national title in 2002.

Other championship contenders
The surprising win of the first season by SC Tavriya Simferopol has never turned the club into a real contender for another title and the club was not always successful to secure a place among the top five. In the beginning of 1990s, FC Chornomorets Odessa and the two-time Soviet champions FC Dnipro were also among the main contenders. The 1972 Soviet champions FC Zorya Luhansk until 2013 really struggled to stay in the top league. Among other contenders there were FC Metalist Kharkiv that were the league's runners-up in 2012–13 and FC Metalurh Donetsk that showed some consistent form in the early 2000s.

Other rivalries
There are few smaller regional rivalries such between Karpaty and Volyn, Metalist and Dnipro, Zorya and Shakhtar.

Among city derbies, there were no running city derbies in the league for the 2017–18 season. Among the most notable previously there were Zaporizhzhia derby between Metalurh and Torpedo, Kyiv derby between Dynamo and Arsenal (CSKA), Donetsk derby between Shakhtar and Metalurh. Other derbies existed in Lviv, Odesa, Kharkiv, West Ukrainian football derby and others.

Stadiums and attendance

Ukraine has several big stadiums with capacity of 30,000+ spectators and at least two stadiums with capacity of over 50,000 which also are considered to be by UEFA the elite stadiums. Since the 2014 Russian aggression against Ukraine, the access to some stadiums was restricted. Many stadiums in Ukraine and their surrounding infrastructure were renovated in preparation to the Euro 2012.

UEFA Elite Stadiums

Other major stadiums
Among 30,000+ football stadiums or multi-use stadiums adopted for football are Arena Lviv, Chornomorets Stadium, Dnipro-Arena, Metalist Stadium and others.

Other UEFA 4-category stadiums in the league:

Attendance 

Source:

See also

Ukrainian First League
Ukrainian Second League
Ukrainian derby
Football records in Ukraine
List of foreign Ukrainian Premier League players

Notes

References

External links

 UPL.ua (official website)
 
 Premier League 2012/2013 Regular Season, Soccerway
 Ukraine – List of Champions, RSSSF.com
 Official Fantasy League Game, Real Manager
 UPL statistics and mathematics

 
1
Ukraine
Sports leagues established in 1991
1991 establishments in Ukraine
Football governing bodies in Ukraine
Ukrainian Association of Football
Football
Professional sports leagues in Ukraine